WHO-CHOICE (CHOosing Interventions that are Cost-Effective) is an initiative started by the World Health Organization in 1998 to help countries choose their healthcare priorities. It is an example of priority-setting in global health. It was one of the earliest projects to perform sectoral cost-effectiveness analyses (i.e., cost-effectiveness analyses that compare a wide range of types of spending within a sector and prioritize holistically) on a global scale. Findings from WHO-CHOICE have shaped the World Health Report of 2002, been published in the British Medical Journal in 2012, and been cited by charity evaluators and academics alongside DCP2 and the Copenhagen Consensus.

History

Launch and initial years of WHO-CHOICE 

In May 1998, Gro Harlem Brundtland succeeded Hiroshi Nakajima as the Director-General of the World Health Organization, and the organization was significantly restructuring as a result of the leadership change. With her election, a new program, called Choosing Interventions: Effectiveness Quality, Costs, Gender and Ethics, was launched as part of the Global Programme for Evidence on Health and Policy. The name of the program would later morph into WHO-CHOICE.

Subsequent use 

WHO-CHOICE was used in the World Health Report of 2002, specifically informing the recommendations in Chapter 5.

Results based on WHO-CHOICE were published in a series of papers in the British Medical Journal in 2012.

Tools and methods

Adoption of sectoral CEA 

Prior to WHO-CHOICE, most projects that did cost-effectiveness analysis (CEA) in the real world focused on evaluating a single program or intervention, comparing it against either a fixed price threshold or an existing array of interventions with predetermined cost-effectiveness taken from the literature. However, theoretical literature on CEAs considered a broader kind of CEA called "sectoral CEA" where all programs and interventions available within a sector would be compared and cost-effectiveness priorities would be determined. Prior to WHO-CHOICE, there were only a few examples of practical implementation of sectoral CEAs: the Oregon Health Services Commission (tasked with prioritizing for Medicaid in the United States), the World Bank Health Sectors Priorities Review, and the Harvard Life Saving Project. Of these, only the World Bank's work had attempted a global comparison. In a 2000 paper discussing the WHO-CHOICE approach, Murray et al. identified four challenges to a wider application of sectoral CEA:

 Resource allocation decisions affecting the entire health sector must also take into account social concerns, such as priority for the sick, reducing social inequalities in health, or the well-being of future generations. The history of the Oregon Health Services Commission provides an example of the sort of conflicts that emerge as a result of balancing all these concerns.
 Current CEA is too focused on the evaluation of new strategies, rather than identifying potential for efficiency improvements by reallocating within existing strategies.
 For all but the richest societies, the cost and time required to evaluate the large set of interventions required may be prohibitive.
 It is difficult to institutionalize CEA, and a number of conflicting CEA guidelines at national and regional levels have proliferated.

Use of generalized CEA (a type of sectoral CEA) based on epidemiological subregions 

WHO-CHOICE identified a key trade-off in sectoral CEA based on the granularity of the region at which the CEA was performed. At one extreme, sectoral CEA could be performed at the level of individual cities or districts, incorporating information about local resources, costs, and current context. At the other extreme, a single CEA could be carried out globally. Highly localized sectoral CEA would be very expensive and difficult to perform whereas global CEA would fail to take into account the huge differences between the epidemiology and resource structure of regions.

WHO-CHOICE's solution was to use an intermediate level of granularity, that it called "generalized CEA" (GCEA). It argued that at this intermediate level, it could conduct CEAs more efficiently while also allowing local policymakers and agents to use its findings and further adapt them to local contexts.

WHO-CHOICE has divided the world into 14 epidemiological subregions, and publishes its findings by subregion, as shown below. Each subregion is a combination of a region (a geographical region of the world) and a mortality stratum (a stratum describing the level and nature of mortality). WHO-CHOICE chose to put each country in a single mortality stratum and a single region (and therefore a single subregion) even if mortality varies widely within the country.

 There are 6 regions: AFR (Africa), AMR (Americas), EMR (Middle East), EUR (Europe), SEAR (South-East Asia), and WPR (West Pacific). 
 There are 5 mortality strata, defined as follows:
 A = very low rates of adult and child mortality
 B = low adult mortality, low child mortality
 C = high adult mortality, low child mortality
 D = high adult mortality, high child mortality
 E = very high adult mortality, high child mortality

Although the 6 regions and 5 mortality strata could give a theoretical maximum of 6 X 5 = 30 subregions, only 14 subregions occur in practice because not every region has countries with all mortality strata.

Below is the classification into subregions as of 2003.

Modifications to ICM-CEA to use null set as comparator for interventions 

The CEA done by WHO-CHOICE differed from the standard ICM-CEA in two important ways:

 Interventions were compared against the null set of interventions, rather than the existing backdrop of interventions. This provides a complete cost-effectiveness analysis that can be adapted more easily to different subregions and different times.
 Results are presented in a single league table. For each set of mutually exclusive interventions (between which a selection is being made), the intervention with the lowest average cost-effectiveness with respect to the null set is presented first. If there are two or more rows, the second intervention is the one with the lowest slope with respect to the internvention with the lowest CE, and so on. Essentially, this identifies the principal components for the best intervention.

Intended usage 

The results that WHO-CHOICE reports are not intended to be applied literally when choosing policies or selecting interventions. This is for a few reasons:

 The interventions available in a specific local context, as well as the cost and effectiveness estimates, may vary between contexts. Some interventions covered by WHO-CHOICE may not exist in the local context, and other interventions available in the local context may not be covered by WHO-CHOICE.
 The model does not fully capture all the real-world interactions and phenomena. For instance, transition costs are not modeled separately.
 The ranking of interventions by cost-effectiveness could be fairly non-robust, with huge margins of error making the ranking uncertain.

Rather, the results are intended to be used as a starting point in classifying interventions as highly cost-effective, moderately cost-effective, and cost-ineffective. With this classification in place, a more detailed and localized analysis can be done for the highly cost-effective interventions, incorporating concerns such as poverty, equity, implementation capacity, and feasibility.

Tools used for the estimates 

WHO-CHOICE lists the following tools that it uses and can provide to researchers interested in using WHO-CHOICE:

 PopMod simulates the time evolution of an arbitrary population subject to births, deaths, and two distinct disease conditions. It has yearly granularity and keeps track of population by age and sex. A research paper describing PopMod called it the first multi-state dynamic life table, and highlighted how it modeled multiple diseases with interaction terms.
 CEA country contextualization templates: These templates help contextualize WHO-CHOICE's results (that are provided at the level of epidemiological subregion) to specific countries based on estimated information about population and costs in the country, that is pre-populated into the tool.
 CostIt (Costing Intervention Templates) is a software for the recording and analysis of cost data. It is not a data-collection tool but can guide the development of instruments for collecting data. Its main value add is in automating the computation of the economic costs of intervention, though it can also be used to compute financial costs. One feature of CostIt is that it automatically adjusts for capacity utilization, and therefore, comes to different conclusions based on different levels of capacity utilization: for instance, it would come to different conclusions if the hospital bed occupancy rate were 30% than if it were 80%.
 MCLeague (Monte Carlo League) is a software program that represents uncertainty around costs and effects to decision-makers in the form of stochastic league tables. It provides information on the probability that any given intervention is in the optimal intervention mix for a given level of resource availability. The program also allows for covariance between costs and outcomes.

Results 

This section focuses on results published by the WHO-CHOICE team or other material published by the World Health Organization relying on WHO-CHOICE data. For examples of use of WHO-CHOICE data by others, see the Reception section.

World Health Report of 2002 

The World Health Report of 2002 relied on WHO-CHOICE. Specifically, it used the division of the world into epidemiological subregions in its analysis of health risks, and used recommendations generated by WHO-CHOICE in Chapter 5, "Some Strategies to Reduce Risk". Here are the key results in the report based on WHO-CHOICE:

Report on scaling up Millennium Development Goals 

The WHO-CHOICE database was one of the sources of data used for the 2009 World Health Organization costing report Constraints to Scaling Up the Health Millennium Development Goals: Costing and Financial Gap Analysis. Background Document for the Taskforce on Innovative International Financing and Health Systems (published 2010). The report was a costing analysis of health system strengthening in order to meet the Millennium Development Goals by 2015, and relied on WHO-CHOICE data and published WHO-CHOICE work for some specific cost estimates. It is cited on the WHO-CHOICE website as an example of the use of WHO-CHOICE to generate Global Price Tags.

Series of papers in the British Medical Journal in 2012 

In 2012, a number of papers were published in the British Medical Journal disseminating results from WHO-CHOICE. A discussion of the findings on the Giving What We Can blog summarized the results as follows: "countries should try to expand high-priority interventions to near-universal coverage before considering second-priority interventions on a limited scale." Below are the main results:

Reception 

Charity evaluator GiveWell has referenced WHO-CHOICE estimates alongside estimates from the Disease Control Priorities Project's DCP2 report, the Copenhagen Consensus, and The Lancet series on nutrition.

Giving What We Can, a charity evaluator and advocate of more effective giving, reviewed WHO-CHOICE's results, and emphasized that these results "should perhaps not be taken from the individual donor’s perspective, but rather from the perspective of someone who can influence the health system of that country." GWWC has also referenced WHO-CHOICE and compared it with DCP2 in some of its coverage of diseases.

WHO-CHOICE has also been cited alongside DCP2 and the Copenhagen Consensus in general discussions of cost-effectiveness analyses.

See also

 Disease Control Priorities Project
 Copenhagen Consensus
 Priority-setting in global health
 World Health Report

References

World Health Organization